The Magnificat in C major,  486, is a musical setting of the  hymn composed by Franz Schubert in 1816. It is scored for SATB soloists, mixed choir, 2 oboes, 2 bassoons, 2 trumpets, violin I and II, viola, timpani and basso continuo (cello, double bass and organ).

The autograph score is dated 25 September 1816, and was likely to have been composed for vespers at the Lichtental Church.

The work is divided into three distinct movements, forming a musical triptych. This is a typical format found in Schubert's sacred music. Performances require approximately 10 minutes.

 "Magnificat anima mea Dominum" , C major, common time
 "Deposuit potentes de sede" , F major, 3/4
 "Gloria Patri" , C major, 3/4

References

External links
 
 

Church music by Franz Schubert
Schubert
1816 compositions
Compositions in C major